The Boss Is Coming to Dinner is an Australian programme, based on the UK version. The series is by Shine Australia for the Nine Network.

The show see three nervous applicants will host a dinner party in their own home to impress their potential employer. After an evening at their homes, the candidates all take part in an employment challenge, where the boss reduces the field from three to two. The top two are then invited to the boss's home for dinner and the final judgement.

On 1 October 2010, Channel Nine dropped the whole series following low ratings, leaving behind some of the remaining unaired episodes.

Episode Guide

Ratings

Series 1

References 

Nine Network original programming
2010s Australian reality television series
2010 Australian television series debuts
2010 Australian television series endings